Nicholas Carminow (c. 1519–1569), of Respryn, Cornwall, was an English politician.

He was the second son of Thomas Carminow, of Respryn, a gentleman of the bedchamber to Henry VIII, and his wife Elizabeth, daughter of Edward Cheeseman, Cofferer of the Household to King Henry VII, and sister to Robert Cheeseman. His elder brother was John Carminow.

He was a Member (MP) of the Parliament of England for Dunheved in 1547 and for Bodmin in 1559.

References

1519 births
1569 deaths
Politicians from Cornwall
Members of the pre-1707 English Parliament for constituencies in Cornwall
English MPs 1547–1552
English MPs 1559